George Vernon Holloman (1902–1946) with Carl J. Crane developed and demonstrated an automatic landing system for airplanes. For their invention they were awarded the Mackay Trophy in 1938. He died in a crash in Formosa in 1946. Holloman Air Force Base was named after him.

References

1902 births
1946 deaths
Aviators killed in aviation accidents or incidents in China
Victims of aviation accidents or incidents in 1946
Victims of aviation accidents or incidents in Taiwan